The Futrono-Riñihue Batholith is a group of plutons in the Andes of Los Ríos Region, southern Chile. The plutons date to the Permian.

References 

Batholiths of South America
Lithodemic units of Chile
Geology of Los Ríos Region
Permian Chile
Permian magmatism